Clarence Berndt Adolf Blum (10 July 1897 in Liverpool, England – 23 September 1984 in Täby, Sweden) was a British-Swedish sculptor.

Clarence Blum studied at the Academy of Fine Arts in Stockholm. His art works include a fountain outside the Eastman Institute in Stockholm (1936), the sculptures  Fiskegumma  at Fisktorget (1949), Malmö and  Girl with a skipping rope (1967) at Högalidsparken in Stockholm.

References
Svenska konstnärer, Konstbokens förlag, Jönköping 2007, page 60

Swedish male sculptors
1897 births
1984 deaths
Artists from Liverpool
British emigrants to Sweden
20th-century British sculptors
British male sculptors
20th-century British male artists